The 2012 ISF Women's World Championship is an international softball competition being held at Pepsi Softball Centre in Whitehorse, Yukon, Canada from July 13 to July 22, 2012. It is the 13th edition of the tournament.

Group stage

Section A

Section B

Playoffs

Day 1

Day 2

Medal round

External links
Official Website
ISF Softball at Twitter

References

Women's Softball World Championship
Softball World Championship
International softball competitions hosted by Canada
Sports competitions in Yukon
Women's Softball World Championship
Softball World Championship
Women's Softball World Championship
Sport in Whitehorse